The Pirate Party is a registered political party in Finland. The group currently has around 173 paying members. The chairman of the party is Riikka Nieminen. The party is a member of Pirate Parties International and European Pirate Party.

History
In January 2008, Matti Hiltunen registered the domain piraattipuolue.fi and set up a BBS on the site. In May 2008, about 50 founding members of the party held the founding assembly in Tampere. In September 2008 the party started to collect the 5,000  needed to officially register the party. The party's goal was to take part in the 2009 European Parliamentary election. The supporter cards were collected by 1 June 2009, too late for the elections. The party was officially registered on 13 August 2009.

In October 2009, the Pirate Party took part in the special municipal election of Loviisa with 1 candidate, but did not win a seat. The party's first major election was the 2011 Finnish parliamentary election with 127 candidates in 11 constituencies, gathering 0.5% of votes and becoming the largest party to have no seats in parliament. In the 2014 European Parliament election it gathered 12,378 votes (0.7%). In the 2015 Finnish parliamentary election the party got 25,105 or 0,8% of total votes, and was left without seats in the parliament. Consequently, Ministry of Justice decided to remove the Pirate Party among 5 others from its list of political parties due to lack of confidence in parliamentary voting for two elections. The party collected the needed 5,000 supporter cards again and was registered on 6 June 2016.

In the 2017 municipal elections, the Pirate Party gained two seats on municipal councils, one in Helsinki and one in Jyväskylä. Helsinki's council member Petrus Pennanen received 1,364 votes; Jyväskylä's council member Arto Lampila received 191 votes.

Political goals
In its political agenda, the party aims to develop open democracy, safeguard civil rights and increased transparency in politics. It wants to free information and culture from prohibitive restrictions and review the utility of the patent system, all while increasing privacy and freedom of speech. The party supports a basic income and wants to abolish daylight saving time.

Pirate Youth
The party has a youth organisation, the Pirate Youth. It was founded on 5 February 2009 in Helsinki. It has an upper age-limit of 28 years. Membership of Piraattinuoret is free of charge.

Electoral performance

Parliamentary elections

European Parliamentary elections

Municipal elections

Party chairs 

 Carl E. Wahlman (2008)
 Pasi Palmulehto (2008–2012)
 Harri Kivistö (2012–2014)
 Tapani Karvinen (2014–2016)
 Jonna Purojärvi (2016–2018)
 Petrus Pennanen (2018–2019)
 Pekka Mustonen (2019–2020)
 Riikka Nieminen (2020-)

References

External links

Pirate Party of Finland
Information in English

Finland
Registered political parties in Finland
Political parties established in 2008
Political parties supporting universal basic income
2008 establishments in Finland